Garry Barr Nehl, AM (born 19 February 1934) was an Australian politician.

Born in Newcastle, New South Wales, he attended Sydney Boys High School from 1946 to 1951. He was a station overseer, newspaper proprietor, and marketing and public relations officer before his election to Armidale City Council. He contested the state seat of Clarence in 1968 for the New England New State Movement, winning 35.72% of the vote compared to sitting MP Bill Weiley's 64.28%. In 1984, he was elected to the Australian House of Representatives for the seat of Cowper, representing the National Party. He held the seat until his retirement in 2001.
During his time in the House of Representatives he served as the Deputy Speaker in the 1996 and 1998 Parliaments, the first five years of the John Howard premiership, under three Speakers: Bob Halverson, Ian Sinclair, and Neil Andrew.

References

National Party of Australia members of the Parliament of Australia
Members of the Australian House of Representatives for Cowper
Members of the Australian House of Representatives
Members of the Order of Australia
1934 births
Living people
21st-century Australian politicians
20th-century Australian politicians